Carolina is a village  that straddles the border of the towns of Charlestown and Richmond on the Pawcatuck River in Washington County, Rhode Island. Rhode Island Route 112 passes through the village. Carolina is identified as a census-designated place, with a population of 970 at the 2010 census.

Overview
The Carolina Village Historic District was listed on the National Register of Historic Places in 1974. It includes examples of Greek Revival, Italianate, and Queen Anne style. It encompasses properties along Carolina Main Street and Carolina Back Road and their vicinity between Pine Hill Road and Alton-Carolina Road (Route 91), including houses along Butter Lane, Tall Pines Drive, Schoolhouse Lane, Carolina Mill Lane, and Downs Court.

History

In 1802, the first wooden dam and a gristmill were built on the river at the site of the village, which was then known as Nichols Bridge.  A few years later, a cotton mill was established, with production buildings mostly located in Richmond and some employee housing located across the river in Charlestown. Rowland G. Hazard bought the mill in 1843 and renamed it the Carolina Mills Company in honor of his wife Caroline Newbold Hazard of South Kingstown. The village around the mill was also given the same name.  The Rhode Island Historic Preservation Commission described 19th-century Carolina as a "center for the surrounding area, including a school, a church, a post office, a bank, several stores, a blacksmith shop, and halls for meetings, lectures, and 'entertainments'." The local post office was named "Carolina Mills" from 1850 until 1879, when it was renamed "Carolina."

In 1862, the complex switched from cotton textile production to production of woolens. The Hazard family operated the mill complex until 1863, when they leased it to T.R. Hyde & Co., which was a partnership between Thomas R. Hyde and Rowland Hazard II that operated the mill until 1868. The mill was sold to new owners in 1869, but Rowland Hazard II operated it as a lessee until at least 1877. The mill complex operated until 1930 or 1935.

The mill complex deteriorated after its closure, and Carolina became a residential community. However, other components of the village remained intact and it was listed on the National Register in 1974. The portion of Carolina village which is located in the town of Richmond includes a corridor of about two dozen 1-story and 1½-story cottages and other domestic buildings built between about 1840 and 1870. Other buildings of historic interest include the remains of the mill; the Carolina School, built in 1845; the Carolina Free Will Baptist Church, built in 1845 and relocated in 1865; the octagonal Albert Potter House, built in 1867; and a 2½-story Queen Anne style house built by Ellison Tinkham, who was one of the owners of the mills from 1868 until 1907.

Carolina was also the site of one of the first trout farms in America.  John W. Hoxie established the Clearwater Trout Farm in 1877 on White Brook on land leased from Rowland G. Hazard, north of the village center.  Two years later, Hoxie's brother Charles established his own White Brook Trout Hatchery on an adjacent plot of land along the brook.  By 1892, the White Brook Trout Hatchery was incorporated as the American Fish Culture Company with Rowland Hazard II as a minority shareholder.  The Hazard family gained controlling interest in the corporation in 1899.  Upon the death of John W. Hoxie in 1903, the R. Hazard Estate acquired full interest in Clearwater Trout Farm, and both farms were eventually merged and operated as American Fish Culture Company by the Hazard Family until its sale to the State of Rhode Island in 1995. By the early 1920s, American Fish Culture Company was considered to be the largest fish farm in America.

Geography
According to the United States Census Bureau, the Carolina CDP has a total area of 2.48 square miles (6.43 km), of which 2.46 square miles (6.37 km) is land and 0.02 square miles (0.05 km) (0.85%) is water. Carolina has its own zip code, 02812, but only the Richmond side is serviced by the Carolina post office despite the post office building being located in Charlestown.

See also
National Register of Historic Places listings in Washington County, Rhode Island

References

Villages in Washington County, Rhode Island
Historic districts on the National Register of Historic Places in Rhode Island
Census-designated places in Washington County, Rhode Island
History of the textile industry
Charlestown, Rhode Island
Richmond, Rhode Island
Providence metropolitan area
Villages in Rhode Island
Census-designated places in Rhode Island